Professor The Hon. Felice Lieh–Mak, CBE, JP, FRCP, FRANZCP, Emeritus Professor at the University of Hong Kong (born ), is a Philippines-educated and British-trained Hong Kong physician, psychiatrist, academician, editor, and retired civil servant.

Background
She graduated from the University of Santo Tomas in the Philippines and undertook specialty training in London, joining the University of Hong Kong (HKU) in 1978. She was a member of Hong Kong's Legislative and Executive Councils; served as Chairwoman of the Medical Council and of the English Schools Foundation (until her resignation from the latter in March 2011 for personal reasons, including the arrival of her first grandchild); as President of the World Psychiatric Association; and as an Advisor to the United Nations and the World Health Organization.

Education
 University of Santo Tomas, MD (cum laude), 1964, Medicine, Philippines
 Licentiate of Apothecaries LAH, 1967 Medicine Hall, Dublin, Ireland

Notable appointments
1966–67: Senior House Officer (Psychiatry), Littlemore Hospital, University of Oxford, Oxford, UK
1968–69: Medical Officer in Psychiatry, Castle Peak Hospital, Hong Kong
1970–70: Senior House Officer, Littlemore Hospital, Oxford University
1971–78: Lecturer, Department of Psychiatry, University of Hong Kong (HKU)
1974–74: Honorary Registrar, Park Hospital for Children, Oxford University
1974–74: Honorary Registrar, Warneford Hospital, Oxford University
1978–81: Senior Lecturer, Department of Psychiatry, University of Hong Kong (HKU)
1981–83: Reader, Department of Psychiatry, University of Hong Kong (HKU)
1990–94: President, Hong Kong College of Psychiatrists
1992–97: Member, Executive Council, Governor's Cabinet, Hong Kong
1993–98: Chairman, Kowloon Regional Advisory Committee of the Hospital Authority
1993–96: President, World Psychiatric Association
1994–96: Chief Examiner, Hong Kong College of Psychiatrists
1994–97: Chairman, Kwai Chung Hospital Governing Committee
1996–99: Chairman, Education Foundation, World Psychiatric Association

Notable affiliations
 1979–present: Consultant, University Health Service, University of Hong Kong (HKU)
 1980–present: Consultant (Psychiatry), Hong Kong Government
 1983–present: Professor and Head, Department of Psychiatry, University of Hong Kong (HKU)
 1983–present: Honorary Advisor, Hong Kong Mental Health Association
 1987–present: Member, Editorial Board, Journal of the Hong Kong Medical Association
 1991–present: Member, International Editorial Board, Journal of Stress and Depression
 1994–present: Corresponding Editor, British Journal of Psychiatry
 1994–present: Consultant, World Health Organization (WHO)
 1994–present: Member, Editorial Board of the Hong Kong Medical Association
 1996–present: Member, Editorial Board, Current Opinion in Psychiatry
 1997–1999:    Chairman, Hong Kong Medical Council
 1997–present: Member, Editorial Advisory Board, Journal of Mental Health Policy and Economics
 1998–present: Chairman, Task Force on Review of Psychiatric Services
 1998–present: Member, Steering Committee on Healthcare Financing of the Hong Kong Government
 1998–2001:    President, Asian Union Against Depression and Related Disorders
 1999–present: Chairman of Queen Mary Hospital's Planning Committee
 1999–present: Member, Working Group on Quality Assurance, Medical Council of Hong Kong
 1999–present: Member, Global Forum for Health Research of the WHO/World Bank Mental Health Reform Initiative

Notable honours/fellowships
 August 1981: Fellow of the World Association for Social Psychiatry
 October 1983: Fellow of the Royal Australian and New Zealand College of Psychiatrists
 December 1985: Fellow of the Royal College of Psychiatrists (United Kingdom)
 August 1989: Outstanding Woman Physician (Philippines)
 April 1990: Corresponding Fellow of the American Psychiatric Association
 March 1991: Corresponding Fellow of the German Association for Psychiatry & Neurology
 October 1991: Honorary Member of the Italian Society of Psychiatry
 January 1992: Honorary Member of the Egyptian Psychiatric Association
 June 1994: Honorary Fellowship of the Royal College of Psychiatrists (UK)
 May 1995: Asian-American Award of The American Psychiatric Association
 October 1995: Fellow of the New York Academy of Science
 August 1996: Honorary Fellow of the World Psychiatry Association
 June 1997: Commander of the Most Excellent Order of the British Empire (CBE)

Notable patients

Leslie Cheung 
Felice Lieh-Mak was the psychiatrist of Leslie Cheung, one of the most famous pop music icons in Asia. Leslie Cheung suffered from severe depression and sought treatment from Professor Lieh-Mak for almost a year. Despite her treatment effort Leslie Cheung finally killed himself by leaping off from the 24th floor of the Mandarin Oriental hotel, located in the Central district of Hong Kong Island, citing depression as the cause. As one of the most popular performers in Asia, Cheung's death broke the hearts of millions of his fans across Asia and shocked the Asian entertainment industry and Chinese community worldwide.

Cheung's suicide note (translation):"Depression! Many thanks to all my friends. Many thanks to Professor Felice Lieh-Mak (麥列菲菲). This year has been so tough. I can't stand it anymore. Many thanks to Mr. Tong. Many thanks to my family. Many thanks to Sister Fei (沈殿霞). In my life I have done nothing bad. Why does it have to be like this?"Despite the high profile of the patient, no comment has been given by Prof. Lieh-Mak on this incident.

Controversies 
Felice Lieh-Mak was involved in a case of failure to take proper steps to ensure complete removal of medical equipment which allegedly resulted in suicide of one of her patients after suffering from years of unbearable pain. The incident involved leaving behind a 2 mm long broken needle in the facial region of the patient. When confronted by the patient, Prof. Lieh-Mak maintained that the needle used in the electroconvulsive therapy, a common procedure practised in psychiatry, was put in and removed by a technician and that she had no responsibility for the mishap. This is in contradiction to one of her most controversial verdicts as Chairperson of the Medical Council Inquiry. On 9 May 2018 a doctor was found guilty of medical misconduct for failing to supervise his fellow nursing staff to perform standard tracheostomy care even though the doctor was not involved in the procedure, nor was he aware of that particular procedure which allegedly led to the patient's death.

References

External links
 http://www4.hku.hk/honfellows/fellow_detail.php?section=fellow&id=19
 http://www.cchi.com.hk/ourteam/FeliceLiehMak/index.htm

Hong Kong people of Filipino descent
1941 births
Hong Kong medical doctors
Hong Kong civil servants
Academic staff of the University of Hong Kong
Members of the Executive Council of Hong Kong
Commanders of the Order of the British Empire
Fellows of the Royal College of Psychiatrists
Government officials of Hong Kong
University of Santo Tomas alumni
Living people
HK LegCo Members 1991–1995